Mia Nuriah Freudweiler (born 15 April 2003) is a Pakistani former alpine skier. She was the first female Pakistani athlete to compete in a Youth Olympic Games after qualifying for the 2020 Winter Youth Olympics in Lausanne.

Freudweiler grew up in Switzerland and lives in Villars-sur-Ollon.

Skiing career 
Freudweiler participated in her first FIS race (Entry League FIS) in October 2019, in downhill skiing in Snow Valley in Belgium, where she came in 19th place..

She participated in the 2020 Winter Youth Olympics, the first time Pakistan participated in a Youth Olympics. She finished 46th in the Super-G race, which was won by Amélie Klopfenstein from Switzerland. In the following super combined event she rose to rank 30th.  She did not finish the slalom nor the giant slalom

A ski accident in February 2020 put an end to her ski racing career.

References

External links 
 FREUDWEILER Mia Nuriah - Athlete Information Standings at the International Ski Federation
 Mia Nuriah Freudweiler ouvre la voie aux jeunes femmes du monde entier - Olympic News IOC News
 One to watch: Mia Nuriah Freudweiler Profile in Destinations Travel Across Pakistan
 JOJ 2020: Mia Nuriah Freudweiler, la voix du Pakistan RTS Sports
 Podcast: Aksel Lund Svindal's message for Lausanne 2020 and Pakistani skier Olympics.com podcast with Aksel Lund Svindal

Pakistani female alpine skiers
2003 births
Living people
Alpine skiers at the 2020 Winter Youth Olympics
21st-century Pakistani women